In traditionalist philosophy, pontifical man is a divine representative (vicegerent of God) who serves as a bridge between heaven and earth. Promethean man, on the other hand, sees himself as an earthly being who has rebelled against God and has no knowledge of his origins or purposes. This concept was notably developed in contemporary language by the Iranian philosopher Seyyed Hossein Nasr.

Symbolism
Nasr used the term "Pontifical" in its etymological sense to convey that the human being is the gateway between Heaven and Earth, living on a circle of which he is always conscious and to which he strives to reach in his life. For Nasr, Pontifex is the "sacred man", who connects physical and spiritual realms, whereas Prometheus is the "profane man", the robber of fire from the dwelling of the gods. Nasr used the Prometheus image differently from Aeschylus and Shelley in Prometheus Bound and Prometheus Unbound. In these legends, he is portrayed as a hero, a demi-god or Titan who is prepared to endure endless torment in order to impart light to an ignorant and suffering humanity, even if it means defying the divine authority. In Nasr's perspective, however, the symbolism acquires a new meaning. Prometheus is portrayed as a thief of celestial fire, a rebel against the Divine, and a man who has lost sight of his own purpose.

Gai Eaton, commenting on Nasr's views of humanity, says that Pontifex is a notion that is similar to khalifatullh fi'l'ard  (vicegerent of God on earth) and symbolizes the same underlying premise. The Prometheus myth, on the other hand, reflects Western man's perception of himself as a "little god", who takes pride in taking that which does not belong to him from heaven, disobeying the divine authority.

History
According to David Burrell, Nasr regards Promethean man as a product of the thirteenth-century Aristotelianization of Western philosophy, which some attribute to Averroes. For Nasr, the Promethean man, who is a self centered being, emerged during the Renaissance as a reaction against the traditional understanding of pontifical man. This event is said to correspond with the definitive loss of the sacred character of the universe. Nasr argues that the "exteriorization" of Christian philosophy was reinforced in the seventeenth century by the secularization of cosmological science, which was itself a consequence of "naturalization" of Christian conception of man as a satisfied citizen of this world.

For Nasr, the secularization of science in the seventeenth century mechanized both the notion of the universe and the notion of man, resulting in a world where man was an alien. He argues that the scientism that evolved during this century, along with the seeming success of Newtonian physics, culminated in the establishment of human sciences, which to this day resemble an already obsolete physics. Nasr agrees with Gilbert Durand's notion of "the disfiguration of the image of man in the West" in developing the picture of Promethean humanity. He distinguishes the "proto-Nietzschean construction" of man from the "primordial and plenary nature of man that Islam calls the 'Universal or Perfect Man' (al-Insan al-kamil) and to which the sapiental doctrines of Graeco-Alexandrian antiquity also allude,"—a man "who is the mirror of the divine qualities and names and the prototype of creation".

Polemics
Traditionalism maintains that the anthropology of modernity is 'Promethean' in nature, which has left the "humanum" alone in a meaningless cosmos. For Traditionalists, this is an illusory depiction of man that deviates from the essence of recurring divine revelations. They argue in favor of "pontifical man", a perspective that sees the human as the link between heaven and earth. Nasr contrasts the notion of the pontifical human with that of the modern man. For him, a "pontifical man" is traditional, spiritual, and religious. Modern humans, on the other hand, are promethean beings, who, according to Nasr, deny the existence of God. A Promethean person is irreligious and materialistic in both his or her beliefs and actions.

According to Liu Shu-hsien, Nasr sees Promethean man as a creature of this world who has revolted against Heaven. He "feels at home on earth" and perceives life as a large "marketplace" where he is free to explore and choose whatever he wants. He is submerged in transience and impermanence, having lost his sense of the sacred, and has become a slave of his nafs or lower self, which he considers as liberty. According to this understanding, Promethean man stands against the sacred tradition. Pontifical man, on the contrary, connects the terrestrial and celestial realms. For Nasr, such a man never forgets that he is God's viceroy (khalifat Allah), who exists in a world that he recognizes as having an origin and a center, whose "primordial purity and wholeness he seeks to emulate, recapture and transmit".  Pontifical man recognizes his divine responsibilities as a mediator between heaven and earth, as well as "his entelechy as lying beyond the terrestrial domain over which he is allowed to rule provided he remains aware of the transient nature of his own journey on earth", whereas Promethean man rejects this function and declares independence from the divine.

For Nasr, man's pontifical essence transcends him if he remains true to himself. Man cannot go against his inner essence unless he pays the price of separation from all he is and everything he wishes to be. With his roots in transcendental reality, man has an insatiable desire to be reborn in the spiritual realm with its limitless possibilities, free of the constraints of contingency and finiteness that encircle him. Being human, as Nasr argues, includes a desire to be more than just a human. Hence he has a spiritual longing for the Absolute and the Perennial. A pontifical man is destined to know the absolute and to live in accordance with the will of the Heaven. The Promethean man, on the other hand, is a weak and forgetful individual who succumbs to the spell of the secular and material world. He separates himself from the cosmic and immutable archetypes and becomes completely terrestrial. He loses his actual path in the world by accepting the changing aspects of things as the sole aspects of reality. Such a man thinks he can "live on a circle without a center",  while trying "to misappropriate the role of the Divinity for himself". He represents a shift from the viewpoint of man being created in the image of God to God being created in the image of man. Oblivious to his origin and purpose, Promethean man has caused havoc on the world over the course of five centuries, disrupting the natural order, and has lost sight of what it actually means to be a human, because he only seeks to achieve perfection by reforming his earthly finite existence. 

In contrast, pontifical man is aware that, exactly because he is human, everything he does and thinks has both grandeur and peril. He knows that his activities have an impact on his existence that extends beyond the constrained spatiotemporal settings in which they take place. He understands "that somehow the bark which is to take him to the shore beyond after that fleeting journey" is made of what he achieves and how he lives while in the human realm. Pontifical man is both the mirror of the Center on the periphery and the echo of the Origin in subsequent cycles of time and generations of human history. According to the traditional perspective, this Center is eternally existent inside man himself. Because Eternity is mirrored in the present now, "Pontifical man" has access to the eternal while being outwardly in the province of becoming. He fulfills his full human potential since he possesses a true intellect.

Epistemological perspective

According to Mehdi Aminrazavi, the Promethean and Pontifical man symbolize two distinct "modes of being", each with its own method of cognition. Promethean man, according to Nasr, is the outcome of pure informative or discursive knowledge, whereas pontifical man is the reflection of transformative or realized knowledge. The Promethean man rejects tradition in favor of pure "rational thought." The Pontifical man, on the other hand, relies on esoteric method which is bound by religious law, and which the Promethean man seeks to deconstruct and annihilate. For Pontifical man, only realized knowledge of Reality can alleviate man's unrest and inner disquiet and restore the tranquility and calm that can only be attained by devotion to one's own Divine nature.

Modern science, according to Nasr, has embraced the "Promethean perspective of man," which sees man as "the measure of all things" in comparison to the Pontifical man, who lives in a theocentric universe.  Modernism rejects such theocentric views of reality, removing God from the center of existence and substituting God with man. Instead, it focuses on the individual and individualism, as well as human reason and the senses. Its epistemology, Nasr argues, is mostly based on rationalism or empiricism, and it evaluates everything using human values as the ultimate standard. Traditional science, on the other hand, incorporates metaphysical principles and is theocentric, or God-centered. 

For Nasr, man is greater than what science has discovered about him, and he is neither angel nor animal in the ultimate sense. His intellect, psyche, and spirit have bestowed upon him qualities and characteristics that far exceed the greatest aspirations of the scientific community. According to Sulayman S. Nyang, Nasr sees man as a "pontifical being", yearning for a meeting with the source of his life and existence. He refuses to "enclose" man within the biological framework of Darwinian theory. He claims that the source of man is not the atoms from which he is formed. Man is rather a metaphysical and transcendental entity whose existence is beyond human comprehension, despite the fact that signs of his presence and existence can be found everywhere.

See also
Nasr's ideas:
 Desacralization of knowledge
 Resacralization of knowledge
 Resacralization of nature
 Scientia sacra
 Playing God (ethics)
 Parson-naturalist

Notes

References

Sources
 
 
 
 
 
 
 
 
 
 
 
 
 
 
 
 
 
 
 
 
 
 
 

Perennial philosophy
Traditionalist School
Philosophy of religion
Esotericism
Religion and science
Concepts in philosophical anthropology
Seyyed Hossein Nasr